Goin' Insane is the second album by rap group, Totally Insane. It was released on October 11, 1993 for In-a-Minute Records and featured production from The Enhancer, Stingy, TC, Tony Jackson and Ken Lee. Goin' Insane gained only mild success and peaked at #87 on the Top R&B/Hip-Hop Albums.

Track listing
"Intro"- 1:12  
"Goin' Insane"- 4:38  
"It's On"- 3:04  
"The Bad Hand"- 4:15  
"Pimps Up, Hoes Down"- 5:22  
"The Times"- 4:47  
"A to D"- 4:43  
"That Insane Shit"- 3:44  
"Epa Interview"- :39  
"Backstreet Boys"- 3:42  
"Can't Be Faded"- 2:54  
"Here We Go Again"- 3:11  
"Slangin Bean Pies"- 4:08 
"Maggot Ass Bitches"- 5:17  
"Krazy Shit"- 2:54  
"No Mo Muzik"- 3:54  
"Outro"- 3:04

1993 debut albums
Totally Insane albums